is a former Japanese football player and manager.

Playing career
Nagashima was born in Kanagawa Prefecture on March 22, 1967. After graduating from Nihon University, he played for Fujita Industries from 1989 to 1991.

Coaching career
After playing for two seasons with Fujita Industries, Nagashima became a manager. He spent two seasons with Otsuka Pharmaceutical (later Tokushima Vortis) U-15, then he moved back to Tokyo, where he was assigned first to U-15, then U-18: under his guidance, many players had their debut with FC Tokyo.

Nagashima then worked with Montedio Yamagata before coming back to Tokushima Vortis, where he inherited Shinji Kobayashi's job in 2016  after having been his second for three seasons. He resigned end of 2016 season.

Managerial statistics

References

External links

1967 births
Living people
Nihon University alumni
Association football people from Kanagawa Prefecture
Japanese footballers
Japan Soccer League players
Shonan Bellmare players
Japanese football managers
J2 League managers
Tokushima Vortis managers
Association football defenders